The following is a partial list of the "A" codes for Medical Subject Headings (MeSH), as defined by the United States National Library of Medicine (NLM).

Codes following these are found at List of MeSH codes (A02). For other MeSH codes, see List of MeSH codes.

The source for this content is the set of 2006 MeSH Trees from the NLM.

– body regions

– Anatomic Landmarks

– breast
  – mammary glands, human
  – nipples

– extremities
  – amputation stumps
  – lower extremity
  – ankle
  – buttocks
  – foot
  – forefoot, human
  – metatarsus
  – toes
  – hallux
  – heel
  – hip
  – knee
  – leg
  – thigh
  – upper extremity
  – arm
  – axilla
  – elbow
  – forearm
  – hand
  – fingers
  – thumb
  – metacarpus
  – shoulder
  – wrist

– head
  – ear
  – face
  – cheek
  – chin
  – eye
  – eyebrows
  – eyelids
  – eyelashes
  – forehead
  – mouth
  – lip
  – nose
  – parotid region
  - Superficial Musculoaponeurotic System
  – scalp
  – skull base
  – cranial fossa, anterior
  – cranial fossa, middle
  – cranial fossa, posterior
  – Jugular Foramina
  – Infratemporal Fossa
  – Parapharyngeal Space

– neck
  – Parapharyngeal Space
  – Superficial Musculoaponeurotic System

– Organs At Risk

– perineum

– Torso
  – abdomen
  – abdominal cavity
  – peritoneum
  – Douglas’ Pouch
  – Mesentery
  – Mesocolon
  – Omentum
  – Peritoneal Cavity
  – Peritoneal Stomata
  – Retroperitoneal Space
  – abdominal wall
  – groin
  – inguinal canal
  – umbilicus
  – abdominal core
  – abdominal wall
  – diaphragm
  – pelvic floor
  – back
  – Lumbosacral Region
  – Sacrococcygeal Region
  – pelvis
  – lesser pelvis
  – pelvic floor
  – thorax
  – thoracic cavity
  – Mediastinum
  – Pleural Cavity
  – thoracic wall

– Transplant Donor Site

– Transplants
  – Allografts 
  – Allogenic Cells 
  – Autografts 
  – Bone-Patellar Tendon-Bone Grafts 
  – Composite Tissue Allografts 
  – Heterografts 
  – Isografts

– Trigger Points

– viscera

The list continues at List of MeSH codes (A02).

A01